Jennifer Brenda "Jenny" Meadows (born 17 April 1981) is a retired British athlete. Her main event was the 800 metres, although she previously competed also over the 400 metres. She won the bronze medal at the 2009 World Championships, and a silver at the 2010 World Indoor Championships. At the European Athletics Championships, Meadows took silver outdoors in 2010 and gold indoors in 2011. She also had some international success as part of the Great Britain women's 4 x 400 metres relay squad.

Meadows was the 2011 Diamond League 800 m winner. In 2009, she was the third-fastest British woman over the distance, and currently is the eighth-fastest as of 2022. She was multiple British national champion (mostly indoors). Meadows, along with other athletes such as Caster Semenya and Alysia Montano, has been noted in the press as one of a number of athletes who were repeatedly denied major international medals by doping competitors, particularly from Russia.

Early career

Schools championships
In January 1989, 7-year-old Jenny Meadows joined Wigan & District Harriers. She was the 800 metres winner at the English Schools Junior (under 15 in this case) Championships in 1995. In 1998, she was third at the AAA Junior Indoor Championships in the 400 metres. She also finished second over the distance at the English Schools Championships.

GB team
The 18-year-old represented United Kingdom in the women's 4 × 400 metres relay at the 1999 European Athletics Junior Championships in Riga. A year later, she ran the fastest leg of the women's 4 × 400 metres relay for the British team at the World Junior Championships held in Santiago, helping to secure the gold medal. In 2001 at the European Under-23 Championships in Amsterdam, she finished sixth in the 400 m, and gained a gold in the women's 4 × 400 m relay.

Senior career
During 2000s, she gradually shifted to the 800 metres distance as her specialist event. In 2002, she won her first senior British title in the indoor 800 m to take gold in the indoor 400 m a year later. Apart from relays at several major events, Meadows represented Great Britain at the 2001 European U23 Championships (400 m), 2002 European Indoor Championships (800 m), home 2003 World Indoor Championships (400 m), and 2003 European U23 Championships (400 m). She reached the 800 m semi-finals at the 2006 World Indoor Championships in Moscow in a time of 2:03.95; women's 4 × 400 m relay squad finished sixth.

The 25-year-old reached the final and placed fifth in the 800 m event at the European Indoor Championships Birmingham 2007, and went out of the competition in the semi-finals of the 2007 World Championships in Osaka, Japan with 1:59.39. This was Meadows' first season, when she ran under 2 minutes and she did it both indoors and outdoors.

2008: Beijing Olympics
She finished fifth in the final of her new signature event at the World Indoor Championships in Valencia, Spain.

On 21 June 2008, in Annecy, Meadows achieved her first European Cup victory over the 800 m. On 18 July, she improved her personal best in the event to 1:59.11 at the Paris Golden League meeting. On 19 July, her place in the Beijing 2008 Great Britain Olympic Team was confirmed along with Marilyn Okoro and Jemma Simpson. Meadows qualified for the semi-final of the 800 m event at the Olympic Games after finishing 3rd in her heat with a time of 2.00.33, and in the semi itself ran close to her personal best in a time of 1.59.43, finishing in sixth place.

2009: World bronze medallist
She had a successful indoor season during 2009 winning the UK Championships / European Indoor Trials, setting a new indoor personal best of 1.59.52 at the Birmingham Indoor Grand Prix, and finishing in fourth place in the European Indoor Championships in Turin, Italy.

On 27 July, her place in the Great Britain Team for the IAAF World Championships in Berlin, Germany in August was confirmed, along with Jemma Simpson and Marilyn Okoro. On 28 July, Meadows set a new outdoor personal best of 1.58.63 at the IAAF Super Grand Prix, Herculis in Monaco. On 19 August, she took the bronze medal in the World Championship 800 m final in a new lifetime best of 1.57.93, becoming the third-fastest British women of all time at the event. In a BBC interview after winning the bronze medal, Meadows commented: "It proves you should never say never, you should always believe in yourself. If you work hard and keep the faith, good things will happen."

2010: World Indoor Championship & European Championship silver medals
Meadows started the season in great form and on 20 February broke the 7-year British indoor 800 m record, formerly held by Kelly Holmes, with a time of 1:59:11 in Birmingham. She went on to improve her record at the World Indoor Championships in Doha, Qatar on 14 March, where she was awarded the captaincy of the Great Britain team, and claimed the silver medal in 1:58.43.

At the European Championships in Barcelona, Meadows won a bronze, which was later upgraded to silver due to a doping offence by the Russian winner.

2011: European indoor champion & Diamond League winner
At the Paris European Indoor Championships, she earned two medals, securing the silver medal for the 800 m event and a silver as part of British women's 4 × 400 metres relay. As the Russian winner was eventually banned for doping, silver for her individual event was later promoted to gold.

On 31 July, at the age of 30, Jenny finally won her first British senior outdoor title with an 800 m victory at the Aviva National Championships in Birmingham to become national champion.

Meadows won three of the seven Diamond League 800 m races in 2011 – in Shanghai, Birmingham (promotional event) and London (earning $10,000 a win) – to win the overall Diamond League 800 m title. Each overall winner earned an additional $40,000 (US Dollars) in prize money.

She reached the semi-finals of the World Championships Daegu 2011 in South Korea (1:59.07). All three Russian finalists including Yuliya Stepanova, who denied Meadows qualification for the final from the semi, were later disqualified for doping.

2012–13

Achilles injury in 2012 forced her to miss competing in her home London Olympics and in the whole season.

She only competed in two competitions in 2013. Much to the delight of the British fans, Meadows returned to action in February of that year (her first time since September 2011) and finished second at the British Indoor Grand Prix. She placed fourth in the final of the European Indoor Championships in Gothenburg in March, just months after undergoing ankle surgery. The following year, at least one athlete who finished ahead of her was banned for doping offences, however, the result of this event remained unchanged. In the summer of 2013, she injured in turn her thigh and was ruled out of the outdoor season, including 2013 World Championships.

2014–2015
Meadows returned to competition at the start of 2014, running the indoor season and then taking part in her first outdoor season since 2011. She steadily improved performances and on 16 June her place in the England Team for the XX Commonwealth Games in Glasgow was announced. At the British National Championships in June, she secured a bronze. Jenny finished in sixth place at the Commonwealth Games.

She had the best indoor 800 m mark of the 2014/15 season in the world. She was a favourite for the title at the European Indoor Championships in Prague but days before the event contracted a heavy cold/flu and was not at her best. She ran the heats and semi-final but was not well enough to contest the final. Meadows described this as a real low of her career after battling back from injury and drugs cheats for a cold/flu to take away her victory this time. She competed throughout the rest of 2015 but was very disheartened by what she had faced the past few years. She was eliminated in the semi-finals at the World Championships Beijing 2015.

Retirement
The 35-year-old announced her retirement on 7 July 2016, after an injury sustained in the semi-final of the 2016 European Championships in Amsterdam meant that she would be unable to compete in the 2016 Rio Olympics.

Non-competitive career
Meadows was head athletics coach for Manchester City Council before becoming a full-time athlete. She has appeared on the BBC's A Question of Sport in Matt Dawson's team on 13 March 2010, and on the BBC's Mastermind in December 2011, in which her specialist subject was Wigan Warriors.

In 2017, she worked as a pacemaker at major events, including IAAF Indoor Permit, IAAF World Challenge and Diamond League meets.

After retirement, Meadows has worked as a UK Athletics coach, athletics commentator and event host. She joined the BBC Sport team covering athletics at the 2016 Rio Olympics. She has worked as a commentator for World Athletics at least since 2019, as of 2022. She was a pundit on the BBC coverage of the 2022 European Athletics Championships.

Since 2019 Meadows has been a Director of Totally Runable Ltd, a company co-founded by Emily Freeman who work with schools using running to build confidence in sport. She is also part of Keely Hodgkinson's coaching team along with her husband Trevor Painter.

Statistics

International competitions

Circuit wins and titles
 Diamond League 800 m champion:  2011
 800 metres wins.
 2011: Shanghai Golden Grand Prix, British Grand Prix, London Grand Prix

National titles
 British Athletics Championships
 800 metres: 2011
 British Indoor Athletics Championships
 400 metres: 2003
 800 metres: 2002, 2005, 2006, 2008, 2009, 2010, 2015

Notes

References

External links

 
 Totally Runable website
 

1981 births
Living people
Sportspeople from Wigan
English female middle-distance runners
English female sprinters
British female middle-distance runners
British female sprinters
Olympic female middle-distance runners
Olympic athletes of Great Britain
Athletes (track and field) at the 2008 Summer Olympics
Commonwealth Games silver medallists for England
Commonwealth Games medallists in athletics
Athletes (track and field) at the 2002 Commonwealth Games
Athletes (track and field) at the 2014 Commonwealth Games
Universiade medalists in athletics (track and field)
Universiade silver medalists for Great Britain
World Athletics Championships athletes for Great Britain
World Athletics Championships medalists
European Athletics Championships medalists
British Athletics Championships winners
Diamond League winners
Alumni of Liverpool Hope University